Bally is a Swiss luxury fashion house, established in 1851 by Carl Franz Bally and his brother Fritz in Schönenwerd, Solothurn, as Bally & Co. Historically known for its shoes, the house also specializes in bags, accessories, and ready-to-wear.

History

Bally was founded as a shoe making business in 1851 by Carl Franz Bally and his brother Fritz in the basement of their family home in Schönenwerd, Solothurn, Switzerland. Carl Franz Bally had joined the family business, a silk ribbon manufacturer, when he was 17, but decided to go into shoe manufacturing after a stay in Paris. After Carl's death in 1899, the company continued under the management of Carl's sons, Eduard and Arthur and continued to manufacture about two million pairs of shoes a year, employing 3,200 people.

Modern era
In 2008, TPG Capital sold Bally International AG to Vienna-based Labelux Group, a luxury goods holding firm which previously owned Jimmy Choo Ltd, and was founded by the German billionaire Reimann family as part of the family’s investment arm Joh A. Benckiser.

Headquartered in Caslano, Ticino, Switzerland, the company announced  Frédéric de Narp, a former executive at Harry Winston, would become its chief executive officer in November 2013. In February 2018, owner JAB Holding Company agreed to sell a majority controlling stake to Chinese materials conglomerate Shandong Ruyi. In May 2019, Bally appointed its COO Nicolas Girotto, who joined the company in October 2015 and sat on the brand's board of directors and executive committee, as new CEO.

In January 2022, Rhuigi Villaseñor was appointed as creative director. Rhuigi was previously founder, CEO, and creative director of the luxury streetwear brand Rhude.

Boutiques

As of January 2020, Bally's retail network includes 311 boutiques, with 500 multi-brand points of sale spanning 66 countries.

References

External links
 

Shoe brands
High fashion brands
Luxury brands
Swiss brands
Manufacturing companies of Switzerland
Manufacturing companies established in 1851
Retail companies established in 1873
Swiss companies established in 1851
Companies based in the canton of Solothurn